A debate camp or debate institute is a training workshop for high school and collegiate debaters. Usually these camps are held over the summer and last between two and eight weeks. While once attended by only highly competitive policy debaters, many high school students now attend debate institutes, and often urban debate leagues will pay for the students to go to these camps.

Structure
During instruction, students are divided up into different focus groups, or "labs". The instructor(s) is called the "lab leader". Each group has its own focus and goal during the day or week. The lab leader will guide them through the topic and how to argue it. Many institutes will divide students into labs based on skill level and experience. Many institutes offer specialized "advanced" or "scholars" workshops, to which acceptance is highly limited.

Often there are mini tournaments at the end of each camp, and students are given speaker and team awards to cap off the institute.

Popular Camps & Institutes

Policy debate
Public speaking organizations